The North Texas Comic Book Show was a quarterly comic book convention that is held in Dallas. The event was created in October 2011  as an alternative to the larger comic conventions. Initially held in Arlington, TX the event moved to Dallas in November 2013. It has also been referred to as the Dallas Comic Book Show in marketing and the media.

Started as a comic collectors event  the show grew to play host to a number of nationally know comic artists and celebrities. Guests included Tom DeFalco, Rich Buckler, Ron Frenz, Mike Grell, Paul Coker Jr., Scott Hanna, Mark Morales, Ron Marz, Danny Fingeroth, Tom Raney, Michael Golden, Tom Richmond, Randy Emberlin, James O'Barr, Keith Pollard, Arvell Jones, Craig Rousseau, Victor Gischler, Carlo Barberi, Lou Ferrigno, Gigi Edgley, and Richard Hatch.

The event was held in January, April, July, and October/November each year.

The February 2020 show was apparently the last.

References

External links
 North Texas Comic Book Show

Defunct comics conventions
Comics conventions in the United States
Festivals in Dallas
Conventions in Texas